Andrew Coscoran (born 18 June 1996) is an Irish athlete who specializes in middle distance running.

In 2022, he became the Irish national record holder over the 1500 metres.

Early life
Coscoran is from Balbriggan and attended Saint Mary's Diocesan High School in Drogheda. He joined Star of the Sea AC in 2010 as a teenager and quickly developed a passion for middle distance running. Aged 18 years old he was awarded a sports scholarship at Florida State University. Coscoran returned, however, to Ireland to study at Dublin City University and has had marked success with Dublin Track Club and coach Feidhlim Kelly.

Career
Coscoran won the 2020 Irish Indoor Championships in the 1500 metres. In 2021, he took the national outdoor title, and ran new personal bests throughout the year. He was selected for the Irish team at the delayed 2020 Tokyo Summer Olympics. Coscoran progressed to the semi-finals of the men's 1500 m in Tokyo, where he placed 10th in his race with a time of 3:35:84.

In August 2022, Coscoran qualified for the final of the 1500 m event at the 2022 European Athletics Championships held in Munich, Germany, where he finished ninth.

On 25 February 2023, the 26-year-old broke Marcus O'Sullivan's 35-year-old Irish indoor 1500 m record with a time of 3:33:49 for third at the World Tour Indoor Final in Birmingham. He was also 0.01 seconds inside Ray Flynn's national outdoor mark from 1982.

References

External links
 
 
 
 

1996 births
Living people
People from Balbriggan
Sportspeople from Fingal
Irish male middle-distance runners
Florida State Seminoles men's track and field athletes
Athletes (track and field) at the 2020 Summer Olympics
Olympic athletes of Ireland